Franka Anić (born 5 February 1991 in Split, Croatia) is a Slovenian-Croatian taekwondo athlete. Anić lives in Korčula, Croatia, but competes internationally for Slovenia.

Anić qualified for the 2012 Summer Olympics in the 67 kg category. She reached the semifinals where she lost to Hwang Kyung-Seon. In the bronze medal match, she lost to Paige McPherson, thus finishing in 5th place in the tournament. She was Slovenia's flagbearer during the closing ceremonies.

References

Living people
1991 births
Slovenian female taekwondo practitioners
Taekwondo practitioners at the 2012 Summer Olympics
Olympic taekwondo practitioners of Slovenia
Sportspeople from Split, Croatia
Croatian female taekwondo practitioners
People from Korčula
Taekwondo practitioners at the 2015 European Games
European Games competitors for Slovenia
World Taekwondo Championships medalists